Iberville Parish School Board (IPSB) is a school district headquartered in Plaquemine, Louisiana, United States. The district serves Iberville Parish.

History

In 2013 some officials from the City of St. Gabriel announced that they wished to secede from Iberville Parish schools, arguing that their schools were given less attention than warranted.

School uniforms
The district requires all students to wear school uniforms.

Schools

PreK-12 schools
 East Iberville Elementary and High School  (St. Gabriel)

Magnets:
 Mathematics, Science, and Arts Academy - East  (St. Gabriel)
 Mathematics, Science, and Arts Academy - West  (Plaquemine)

7-12 schools
 Plaquemine Senior High School (Unincorporated area, near Plaquemine)
 White Castle High School  (White Castle)

PreK-8 schools
 Crescent Elementary & Junior High School (Unincorporated area)

4-8 schools
 Edward J. Gay Middle School (Unincorporated area)

PreK-6 schools
 Dorseyville Elementary School (Unincorporated area)

PreK-4 schools
 Iberville Elementary School (Plaquemine)
 North Iberville Elementary School (Rosedale)

Former schools
 North Iberville Elementary and High School  (Rosedale)

References

External links

 Iberville Parish School Board

School districts in Louisiana
Education in Iberville Parish, Louisiana